Vil de Matos is a former civil parish in the municipality of Coimbra, Portugal. The population in 2011 was 870, in an area of 8.2 km2. On 28 January 2013 it merged with Antuzede to form Antuzede e Vil de Matos.

It was previously part of the then-municipality Ançã. It was disbanded on 31 December 1853 and became part of the municipality of either Coimbra or Cantanhede, but after 24 October 1855 it was definitely part of Coimbra.

References 

Former parishes of Coimbra